Jihane Almira Chedid (Hanacaraka: , ; ; born February 4, 2000) is an Indonesian People's Consultative Assembly Ambassador, actress, fashion model and beauty pageant titleholder who won the title of Puteri Indonesia Pariwisata 2020. She is known for her work in advocating for #ActYourThoughts orphanage programs. Chedid is the first delegate from Central Java to ever be crowned Puteri Indonesia Pariwisata. She represented Indonesia at the Miss Supranational 2021 pageant held in Poland, where she get crowned Miss Supranational Asia 2021, also won Miss Congeniality, Best National Costume and Miss Supra Fan-Vote award.

Early life and education 

Chedid was born in Semarang, Central Java, Indonesia to a Lebanese father, Jihad Chedid and Javanese mother, Neneng (Nancy) Wulandari Chedid. Her experience in the entertainment industry started when she was 12 years old, by working as an actress and fashion model in Jakarta. She attended high school at Singapore Intercultural School, Bona Vista. She holds a Bachelor of Science in Information Technology from PGRI Semarang University and continued her study of graphic design at the Bina Nusantara University – Jakarta. On 12 March 2020, together with Puteri Indonesia 2020-Ayu Maulida Putri and Puteri Indonesia Lingkungan 2020-Putu Ayu Saraswati, the Puteri Indonesia 2020 queens including Chedid were named People's Consultative Assembly Ambassadors by the Speaker, Bambang Soesatyo. she represented Indonesia in  several international competitions, such as Guess Girl Search South East Asia 2015 together with Puteri Indonesia 2017 - Bunga Jelitha Ibrani, and Nylon magazine face off 2016.

Pageantry

Puteri Central Java 2020 
Chedid joined the contest at the provincial level of the Puteri Central Java 2020, and ended up was chosen as the winner of Puteri Central Java 2020, where she also won "Miss Congeniality" special award.

Puteri Indonesia 2020 
After qualifying the provincial title of Puteri Indonesia Central Java 2020, Chedid represented the province of Central Java in the national beauty contest, Puteri Indonesia 2020, which was held on March 6, 2020.

She was successfully crowned as the winner of Puteri Indonesia Pariwisata 2020 (Miss Supranational Indonesia 2020) by the predecessor of Puteri Indonesia Pariwisata 2019 and Miss Supranational 2019 second runner-up Jesica Fitriana Martasari of West Java. and won "Best Evening Gown" and "1st Runner-up Miss Talent" special awards. The final coronation night was graced by the reigning Miss Supranational 2019, Anntonia Porsild and Miss Supranational 2017, Jenny Kim as the guest star.

During final statement-speech session, Chedid successfully raised her charity foundation called #ActYourThoughts movement, which a Women's empowerment platform across the islands of Indonesia that provide orphanage-elderly care and free healthcare programs. Chedid said:

Miss Supranational 2021 
As the winner of Puteri Indonesia Pariwisata 2020, Chedid will represent Indonesia at the 12th edition of Miss Supranational 2021 pageant, held on 21 August 2021 at Strzelecki Park Amphitheater, Nowy Sącz, Małopolska, Poland. Chedid competed with the other 57 countries, by the end of the event, Jihane ended up as one of the Top 12 finalists (ranked sixth) and automatically crowned as Miss Supranational Asia 2021. Jihane successfully continuing the streak of Indonesia's semi-finalists placement in Miss Supranational for the five consecutive years since 2015. The pageant was aired on Metro TV Indonesia Network. At the finale coronation night, Jihane also won several awards, She is winning "Supra Fan-Vote" award, by that Jihane automatically advanced to the Top 12 semifinalists, and she also won "Miss Congeniality" special award.

During the pre-pageant challenge events Chedid won several awards, advanced to the semifinals of "Supra Chat with Anntonia Porsild" by winning group 4 deep interview. and she is also nominated as one of the Top 11 of "Miss Elegance". Chedid won the "Best National Costume" competition held on 19 August 2021 with her Sumba Equus caballus-inspired ensemble national costume, becoming the fourth Indonesian to win the award, after Lily Estelita Liana in 2014, Gresya Amanda Maaliwuga in 2015 and Wilda Octaviana Situngkir in 2018.

The costume also features Mamuli and Marangga, precious gold ornaments with 10.000 rhinestones beading that wore by the Anakalang Queens of Sumba.

During the preliminary competition, Chedid appeared in a US$45.000  gold dress designed by Hollywood fashion designer Monica Ivena, at the Miss Supranational 2021 evening gown competition. The gown, named "Golden Resilience" was decorated with thousands of Swarovski crystals inspired by Jihane's bright and confident personality.

Filmography 

Chedid has appeared on several television and cinema films, since her debut as an actress in 2012.

Cinema films

Television

See also 

 Puteri Indonesia 2020
 Miss Supranational 2021
 Raden Roro Ayu Maulida Putri
 Putu Ayu Saraswati

References

External links

 
 

Living people
2000 births
Puteri Indonesia winners
Miss Supranational contestants
Indonesian beauty pageant winners
Indonesian actresses
Indonesian female models
Indonesian stage actresses
Indonesian film actresses
Indonesian television actresses
21st-century Indonesian actresses
Indonesian activists
Indonesian Muslims
Children's rights activists
Health activists
Mental health activists
People from Semarang
People from Jakarta
Javanese people
Indonesian people of Lebanese descent